FreeArc is a free and open-source high-performance file archiver developed by Bulat Ziganshin. The project is considered abandonware as no information has been released by developers since 2016 and the official website is down.

A "FreeArc Next" version is under development, with version FA 0.11 released in October 2016. The "Next" version supports 32- and 64-bit Windows and Linux and includes Zstandard support.

Algorithms
FreeArc uses LZMA, prediction by partial matching, TrueAudio, Tornado and GRzip algorithms with automatic switching by file type. Additionally, it uses filters to further improve compression, including REP (finds repetitions at separations up to 1gb), DICT (dictionary replacements for text), DELTA (improves compression of tables in binary data), BCJ (executables preproccesor) and LZP (removes repetitions in text).

Benchmarks

Archive size
In 2010 Tom's Hardware benchmarks comparing it to the other popular archivers, FreeArc narrowly outperformed WinZip, 7-Zip, and WinRAR in its "best compression" mode. In the "default compression" tests, it lost to 7-Zip's LZMA2, but still compressed better than WinRAR and WinZip.

Speed
In the same Tom's Hardware tests, FreeArc was outpaced at default settings by 7zip's LZMA2 default compression, and also by WinRAR, even at its best compression settings. FreeArc's compression at its best settings was slower than both 7zip and WinRAR, but still came ahead of WinZip.

Efficiency
In a metric devised by Werner Bergmans of Maximum Compression Benchmark, FreeArc compression is more efficient than programs for classic formats like .Z (LZW), .zip (Deflate), .gz or bzip2. (The scoring formula used in this non-public test,
 
multiplies the sum of compression and decompression times by a factor that exponentially grades the ratio of archive sizes achieved by the program under test relative to the best known archive size for that data set.) As of November 2010, FreeArc is the top program in this benchmark, followed by NanoZip, bsc and WinRAR. It works faster than WinRAR and 7zip.

Features

Like RAR and ZIP it is an archiver, not just a data compressor like gzip or bzip2. Initially it supported only its own archive format, normally identified by the .arc file name extension, incompatible with others; there is no relationship with other .arc formats. More recently, decompression support for other archive types was added, including zip, rar, and 7z. FreeArc has both a command line interface and a GUI. Other features include:

 Solid compression with "smart updates" which avoid recompression when possible
 AES/Blowfish/Twofish/Serpent encryption, including chaining of encryption algorithms
 FAR and Total Commander plug-ins
 Ability to create self-extracting archives and installers
 Archive protection and recovery layer using Reed–Solomon error correction with user-defined size (for example, recovery over Internet being 0.1%, while default is autosize 1-4%).

Supported platforms
Windows binaries are available from the developer. There is no 64-bit variant of version 0.666, but FA 0.11 supported both 32- and 64-bit systems.

FreeArc Next
In October 2016 the first public release of FreeArc Next was released. It is currently available only as a CLI application for 32 and 64 bit Windows and Linux platforms. New features include:
 Full-archive deduplication similar to ZPAQ
 Support for the Zstandard compression algorithm implemented by Facebook
 Lua programming for the INI file
 Better files prefetching which increases compression speeds

See also

 List of archive formats
 List of file archivers
 Comparison of file archivers
 List of Unix commands
 rzip
 lzma

References

External links
 
  (abandoned)
 Binary files and source code of version 0.67

Lossless compression algorithms
Free data compression software
Archive formats
Unix archivers and compression-related utilities
Cross-platform software
Year of introduction missing
File archivers